Seventh Heaven or 7th Heaven may refer to:

Religious and ancient cosmology
 The highest of Seven Heavens according to Islam and Judaism
 One of the celestial spheres in cosmological models widely used until the early 17th century.

Books
 Seventh Heaven (poetry collection), a poetry collection by Patti Smith, and the title poem
 Seventh Heaven, a 1990 novel by Alice Hoffman
 7th Heaven (novel), a novel in the Women's Murder Club Series by James Patterson

Film, television, and theater
 Seventh Heaven (play), a 1922 Broadway play by Austin Strong
 7th Heaven (1927 film), a silent film with Janet Gaynor
 Seventh Heaven (1937 film), a remake with James Stewart
 Seventh Heaven, a 1955 Broadway musical by Victor Young and Stella Unger
 Seventh Heaven (1956 film), Swedish film
 Seventh Heaven (1993 film) (De zevende hemel), a Dutch romantic comedy
 Seventh Heaven (1997 film) (Le septième ciel), a French film starring Sandrine Kiberlain
 Seventh Heaven, a 2008 Egyptian film nominated for Best Picture in the 5th Africa Movie Academy Awards
 Seventh Heaven (2015 film),  an Israeli musical animated short film
 7th Heaven, a 1989 short directed by Shimmy Marcus
 7th Heaven, a 2004 Norwegian film with music by John Erik Kaada
 7th Heaven (TV series), an American family drama TV series

Music
 Neutron and Star, also known as Seventh Heaven, a British music producer
 7th Heaven (band), an American rock band

Albums 
 Seventh Heaven (Buck-Tick album), 1988
 Seventh Heaven (Kalafina album), 2009
 Seventh Heaven, an EP by Jesu
 Seventh Heaven, by Anthony Phillips and Andrew Skeet
 Seventh Heaven, by Takanori Nishikawa

Songs 
 "Seventh Heaven" (L'Arc-en-Ciel song), 2007
 "Seventh Heaven", by Beck from Colors, 2017
 "Seventh Heaven", by Deep Purple from Abandon, 1998
 "Seventh Heaven", by Perfume, B-side of "Polyrhythm", 2007
 "7th Heaven" (Vanity song), 1985
 "7th Heaven", by Angelina Jordan, 2021

Other uses
 Seventh Heaven (sports), a sports team winning game seven in a best-of-seven playoff series
 Seventh Heaven (horse), thoroughbred racehorse
 Seventh Heaven, a Ferris wheel in Ufa, Bashkortostan
 Seventh Heaven (restaurant), the revolving restaurant in the Ostankino Tower in Moscow, Russia
 Jing, King of Bandits: Seventh Heaven, an animation in the anime series Jing: King of Bandits
 7th Heaven (frequent flyer program), the Air Jamaica frequent–flyer program
 7th Heaven, a bar owned by Tifa Lockhart in the Final Fantasy video-game series

See also
Seven minutes in heaven (disambiguation)
Empyrean
Hyperuranion